The AN/AAQ-28(V) Litening targeting pod is an advanced precision targeting pod system currently operational with a wide variety of aircraft worldwide. The research and development of the Litening was first undertaken by Rafael Advanced Defense Systems' Missiles Division in Israel, with subsequent completion of Litening I for use in the Israeli Air Force.

Litening significantly increases the combat effectiveness of the aircraft during day, night and under-the-weather conditions in the attack of ground and air targets with a variety of standoff weapons (i.e., laser-guided bombs, conventional bombs and GPS-guided weapons). The thousandth pod was sold in October 2010.

Features
Litening is an integrated targeting pod that mounts externally to the aircraft. The targeting pod contains a high-resolution, forward-looking infrared (FLIR) sensor that displays an infrared image of the target to the aircrew; it has a wide field of view search capability and a narrow field of view acquisition/targeting capability of battlefield-sized targets. The pod also contains a CCD camera used to obtain target imagery in the visible portion of the electromagnetic spectrum. An on-gimbal inertial navigation sensor establishes line-of-sight and automatic boresighting capability.

The pod is equipped with a laser designator for precise delivery of laser-guided munitions. A laser rangefinder provides information for various avionics systems, for example, navigation updates, weapon deliveries and target updates. The targeting pod includes an automatic target tracker to provide fully automatic stabilized target tracking at altitudes, airspeeds and slant ranges consistent with tactical weapon delivery maneuvers. These features simplify the functions of target detection and recognition, and permit attack of targets with precision-guided weapons on a single pass.

Background
The research and development program began at Rafael Advanced Defense Systems' Missiles Division in Israel, with subsequent completion of Litening I for use in the Israeli Air Force. In 1995 Northrop Grumman Corporation teamed with Rafael for further development and sales of the Litening pod, reaching IOC the same year.

Litening II/ER/AT
Northrop Grumman Corporation and Rafael Advanced Defence Systems completed product improvements on the "Basic Pod" including a third generation FLIR, laser marker and software upgrades (Litening II) which was fielded beginning in 1999.

Northrop Grumman and Rafael Advanced Defence Systems subsequently replaced the "320x256" FLIR with a latest technology "640x512" FLIR. This pod, known as Litening ER, extended the target detection range and was fielded in 2001. The newest version, Litening AT, is in production and was fielded in 2003. It further extends target detection and recognition ranges, improves the target coordinate generation accuracy, and provides multi-target cueing.

Litening AT features a plug-and-play bay configured to accept a wide variety of data-links and recorders. Plug and Play II data-link capability offers increased range, digital data recording and an option to incorporate secure, two-way communications over ultra-high frequency (UHF) radios. Litening's Plug and Play I, introduced in 2003, was the first data-link to be incorporated in a third generation targeting pod.

Litening G4
Litening G4, which began to be delivered to U.S. forces in 2008, added new sensors for improved target identification and other advanced target recognition and identification features. The Litening G4 provides significant enhancements in terms of both recognition range and image quality due to Rafaels' AVP imaging capability. The G4's technologies include a full 1Kx1K forward looking infrared and charge-coupled device, as well as short wave infrared laser imaging sensors, color symbology, tracker improvement and enhanced zoom. The Litening Gen 4 technology and capability is also available in a kit form that allows users to upgrade their currently fielded Litening pods. The Royal Danish Air Force is the first international partner to take delivery of G4 pods. Rafael Advanced Systems announced on the eve of DefExpo 2014 a large order for 150+ Litening targeting pods for the Indian Air Force's combat aircraft fleet.  Litening G4 pods have been chosen by the Indian Air Force for its frontline fighter aircraft, including the Su-30 MKI, MiG-29 and others.

Litening SE
Litening SE provides laser ranging and designation in support of weapon delivery, navigational functions, and recording and data-linking of generated imagery and data. This version includes a Plug-N-Play (PnP) III(TM) digital two-way, data link LRU inside the pod. The pods are being delivered as part of the United States Air Force's Advanced Targeting Pod – Sensor Enhancement (ATP-SE) program.

Litening III
The Litening III, used on the IAF Tejas, Italian Air Force AMX, and RAF Typhoon aircraft, also provides still image capture for reconnaissance missions in addition to the targeting capabilities found on other models.

RecceLite / RecceLite XR
A gimballed version of the Litening pod for use on drones such as the Predator B or directly integrated into a manned aircraft, in addition it incorporates multi-spectral cameras and C & XU band communication channels to transmit recon feeds. RecceLite XR incorporates the improvements from the Litening 5 pod.

Litening 5
The Litening 5 is the latest version of the pod introduced in 2019. It improves the resolution of the short and medium-wave infrared cameras and introduces a synthetic aperture radar with a 100 km range. The Litening 5 is being introduced to service on Gripen and Typhoon aircraft.

Future developments
Rafael sees an increased market in the future because of the move to stealth platforms which must have targeting systems built in. In 2013 the company was developing a new model to compete for the F-35 requirement. At present F-35's have the equivalent of a Lockheed Martin Sniper XR called the EOTS (Electro Optical Targeting System) built in and from batch 4 the Advanced EOTS with improved cameras. However, in 2020 the delivery to the Israeli airforce of a prototype F-35I with the EOTS's apertures covered over fueled speculation that the F-35I would incorporate a version of the Litening 5 over the Advanced EOTS upgrade.

General characteristics

Primary function: Navigation and infrared/electro-optical targeting

Prime Contractor: Rafael Corporation/Northrop Grumman.

Length: 87 in (2.20 m)

Diameter: 16 in (0.406 m)

Weight: 455 lb (208 kg)

Sensors: Infrared detector, CCD-TV camera, eye safe laser rangefinder and laser designator.

Sensor resolution (for Litening III): CCD (tv): 1K x 1K,  FLIR: 640x480.

Date Deployed: February 2000.

Unit Cost: $1.4 million.

Aircraft use

 A-10 Thunderbolt II,
 AV-8B, 
 B-52H,
 F-14A/B/D, 
 F-15E/D,
 F-16 Block 25/30/40/50, 
 F/A-18A/B/C/D/E/F,
 F-4E AUP, 
 Sukhoi/HAL Su-30MKI "Flanker-H", 
 Aero Vodochody L-159 ALCA, 
 Tornado GR4, 
 HAL Tejas,
 SEPECAT Jaguar
 Eurofighter Typhoon, 
 Saab JAS 39 Gripen, 
 AMX International AMX, 
 Northrop F-5, 
 MIG-21 LanceR A/C of Romanian Air Force.

Operators

Current operators

Brazilian Air Force
AMX (Rafael Litening III)
KC-390 Millenium

Chilean Air Force
F-16 (Rafael Litening III)

Colombian Air Force
IAI Kfir C10/C12

Czech Air Force
JAS-39 Gripen (Rafael/Zeiss Optronics Litening III)

Royal Danish Air Force
F-16 (Northrop Grumman AN/AAQ-28(V)8 Litening G4)

Finnish Air Force
McDonnell Douglas F/A-18 Hornet (Northrop Grumman Litening AT, as part of the MLU 2 upgrade program)

Litening II Pods supplied by Rafael/Zeiss Optronik joint venture
German Air Force
Panavia Tornado (Rafael/Zeiss Optronics Litening probably upgraded to Litening III)
Eurofighter Typhoon (Rafael/Zeiss Optronics Litening III)

Hellenic Air Force
F-4E AUP

Hungarian Air Force
JAS-39 (Rafael/Zeiss Optronics Litening III)

Indian Air Force
Sukhoi Su-30 (Rafael Litening III)
HAL Tejas (Rafael Litening III, Rafael Litening 4I)
Dassault Mirage 2000 (Rafael Litening III)
Mikoyan MiG-29 (Rafael Litening III)

Israeli Air Force
F-15I (Rafael Litening III)
F-16C/D (Rafael Litening probably upgraded to Litening III)
F-16I (Litening C4)

Italian Air Force
AMX (Rafael Litening III)
Italian Navy
AV-8B+ Harrier (Northrop Grumman AN/AAQ-28(V)2 Litening II upgraded to Northrop Grumman AN/AAQ-28(V)4 Litening AT Block 0)

Kazakhstan Air Force
Su-27 (Rafael Litening III)

Royal Netherlands Air Force
General Dynamics F-16 Fighting Falcon (Northrop Grumman AN/AAQ-28(V)6 Litening AT Block 2)

Portuguese Air Force
General Dynamics F-16 Fighting Falcon(Northrop Grumman AN/AAQ-28(V)6 Litening AT Block 2)

Romanian Air Force
MiG-21 LanceR A (Rafael Litening)
MiG-21 LanceR C (Rafael Litening)

Republic of Singapore Air Force
General Dynamics F-16 Fighting Falcon (Rafael Litening III)

South African Air Force
JAS-39 (Rafael/Zeiss Optronics Litening III)

Spanish Air Force/Navy
AV-8B+ Harrier(Northrop Grumman AN/AAQ-28(V)2 Litening II upgraded to Northrop Grumman AN/AAQ-28(V)4 Litening AT Block 0)
McDonnell Douglas EF-18 Hornet (Rafael/ Litening III)
Eurofighter Typhoon (tranche 3) (Litening III and V)

Swedish Air Force
JAS-39 (Rafael/Zeiss Optronics Litening III)

Royal Thai Air Force
JAS-39 (Rafael/Zeiss Optronics Litening III)

Litening III RD & EF pods supplied by Ultra Electronics Limited
Royal Air Force
Eurofighter Typhoon (Rafael/Ultra Electronics Litening III EF)

USAF
Fairchild Republic A-10C Thunderbolt II (Northrop Grumman AN/AAQ-28(V)3 Litening ER upgraded to Northrop Grumman AN/AAQ-28(V)4 Litening AT Block 0)
Boeing B-52H Stratofortress (Northrop Grumman AN/AAQ-28(V)3 Litening ER upgraded to Northrop Grumman AN/AAQ-28(V)4 Litening AT Block 0)
McDonnell Douglas F-15E Strike Eagle (Northrop Grumman AN/AAQ-28(V)3 Litening ER upgraded to Northrop Grumman AN/AAQ-28(V)4 Litening AT Block 0)
General Dynamics F-16 Fighting Falcon (Northrop Grumman AN/AAQ-28(V)1 Litening II/AN/AAQ-28(V)2 Litening II/AN/AAQ-28(V)2 Litening II+ upgraded to Northrop Grumman AN/AAQ-28(V)4 Litening AT Block 0)
USN / USMC
AV-8B+ Harrier (Northrop Grumman AN/AAQ-28(V)1 Litening II/AN/AAQ-28(V)2 Litening II/AN/AAQ-28(V)2 Litening II+ upgraded to Northrop Grumman AN/AAQ-28(V)4 Litening AT Block 0)
McDonnell Douglas F/A-18 Hornet (Northrop Grumman AN/AAQ-28(V)4 Litening AT Block 0)
Northrop Grumman EA-6B Prowler (Northrop Grumman AN/AAQ-28(V)4 Litening AT Block 0)

Venezuelan Air Force
General Dynamics F-16 Fighting Falcon (Rafael Litening)

Former operators

Royal Australian Air Force
 F/A-18A/B (Northrop Grumman AN/AAQ-28 Litening)

Comparable Systems
 Lockheed Martin Sniper XR targeting pod
Thales Damocles
ASELPOD

References

Laser ranging
Military electronics of the United States
Northrop Grumman
Rafael Advanced Defense Systems
Targeting pods
Military equipment introduced in the 1990s